German submarine U-1002 was a Type VIIC/41 U-boat of Nazi Germany's Kriegsmarine during World War II.

She was ordered on 14 October 1941, and was laid down on 4 January 1943, at Blohm & Voss, Hamburg, as yard number 202. She was launched on 6 October 1943, and commissioned under the command of Oberleutnant zur See Albrecht Schubart on 30 November 1943.

Design
German Type VIIC/41 submarines were preceded by the heavier Type VIIC submarines. U-1002 had a displacement of  when at the surface and  while submerged. She had two shafts and two  propellers.

U-1002 was fitted with five  torpedo tubes (four fitted at the bow and one at the stern), fourteen torpedoes or 26 TMA or TMB Naval mines, one  SK C/35 naval gun, (220 rounds), one  Flak M42 and two  C/30 anti-aircraft guns. The boat had a complement of between forty-four and fifty-two.

Service history
U-1002 participated in only one war patrol which resulted in no ships damaged or sunk.

On 9 May 1945, U-1002 surrendered at Bergen, Norway, and was transferred to Lisahally on 30 May 1945, where she would wait nearly seven months for her final fate. Of the 156 U-boats that eventually surrendered to the Allied forces at the end of the war, U-1002 was one of 116 selected to take part in Operation Deadlight. U-1002 was towed out but sank on 13 December 1945, by unknown causes, becoming one of the 56 U-boats that sank before reaching the scuttling areas.

See also
 Battle of the Atlantic

References

Bibliography

External links

German Type VIIC/41 submarines
U-boats commissioned in 1943
World War II submarines of Germany
1943 ships
Ships built in Hamburg
Maritime incidents in December 1945
World War II shipwrecks in the Atlantic Ocean
Operation Deadlight